Christophe Moyon (born 12 May 1963) is a French ice hockey player. He competed in the men's tournament at the 1994 Winter Olympics.

References

External links
 

1963 births
Living people
Olympic ice hockey players of France
Ice hockey players at the 1994 Winter Olympics
People from Albert, Somme
Sportspeople from Somme (department)